7R may refer to:
 Kawasaki Ninja ZX-7R, a supersports bike
 KRCR-TV, a television station in Redding, California that used the branding of "7R" in the past for its designation in TV Guide listings
 RusLine, IATA airline designator
 Sony α7R, a full-frame E-mount digital mirrorless camera
 Yaesu VX-7R, a handheld amateur radio transceiver

See also
R7 (disambiguation)